El Koroum (Arabic: نادي الكروم, Chrome) is an Egyptian football club based in Alexandria.  They were a member of the Egyptian Second Division.  Their home stadium is Alexandria Stadium.

Current squad

Managers
 Salah El-Nahy (July 1, 1982 – December 16, 2000)
 Talaat Youssef (December 16, 2000 – July 1, 2001)
 Salah El-Nahy (July 1, 2002 – July 1, 2006)
 Magdy Allam (July 1, 2008 – August 14, 2011)

Football clubs in Egypt
Sports clubs in Egypt